Musée de la Romanité is an archeological museum in the French city of Nîmes, opened on 2 June 2018.

Description 
The museum is located in front of the Arena of Nîmes and has been designed by the French–Brazilian architect Elizabeth de Portzamparc. Its collection covers several periods of the history of Nîmes, including:
 The pre-Roman era, with the possibility for visitors to discover Gallic houses,
 The Roman era, with some well preserved mosaics, such the mosaic of Pentheus,
 The medieval era

Photo gallery

References

External links 

 Official webpage

Archaeological museums in France
History museums in France
Nîmes